Sarcohyla toyota, or Toyota's tree frog is a frog in the family Hylidae, endemic to Mexico.  Scientists have seen it in cloud forests in the Sierra Madre mountains between 1975 and 2185 meters above sea level.

Scientists place this frog in the same species group as Sarcohyla thorectes.

Original description

References

Frogs of North America
Endemic fauna of Jamaica
Amphibians described in 2019
toyota